Adrien Quiret de Margency also Adrien Cuyret de Margency (1727 – c. 1802) was an 18th-century French officer of the Maison militaire du roi de France (Gentilhomme ordinaire de la chambre du roi), writer and Encyclopédiste.

Biography 
Quiret de Margency was the son of Adrien Cuyret (d. 1744) and Marie Madeleine d'Hocquinquant (d. 1761), married since 4 May 1718. In 1731, the father acquired in the town of Margency a manor and bailiwick of the previous owners for 57,000 livres. Margency is a commune of Val-d'Oise and possibly Adrien Quiret de Margency's birthplace
 
He often frequented the salons of Paris inspired by the philosophie des Lumières, where he could meet Baron d'Holbach, also called the Coterie holbachique or that of Louise d'Épinay.. He had a friendly relation with Jean-Jacques Rousseau.

De Margency wrote some articles for the sixth and seventh volumes of the Encyclopédie by Denis Diderot: Faveurs, Fidélité, Fleurette and Galanterie.

In 1761, de Margency was subject to a creative crisis similar to that of an experienced colleague, Joseph-François-Édouard de Corsembleu. He proposed marriage to his mistress Marie Madeleine de Brémond d'Ars, marquise de Verdelin (1728-1810), who was a widower since 1763.

Selected works 
 La fidélité en amour n'est pas la constance, c'est une vertu plus délicate, plus scrupuleuse et plus rare. Citation d'Adrien Quiret de Margency; Mémoires  1759.
 Aimer d'un amour sincère pour demeurer fidèle. Citation d'Adrien Quiret de Margency; Mémoires 1759

Bibliography 
 Alexandre Nicolon; Claude Collineau; Bernard Deü: Histoire de Margency : 650 ans d'histoire locale, 200 ans d'histoire communale. Saint-Ouen-l'aumône, Valhermeil, 2003. 
 Frank Arthur Kafker: The encyclopedists as individuals: a biographical dictionary of the authors of the Encyclopédie. Oxford, Studies on Voltaire and the eighteenth Century, 1988, S. 246-7

References

External links 

18th-century French writers
18th-century French male writers
Contributors to the Encyclopédie (1751–1772)
1727 births
1800s deaths